Shah Shoja (lit. "the brave shah"), was the ruler of the Mozaffarids from 1358 to 1384. He was the son and successor of Mubariz al-Din Muhammad. During the lengthy reign of Shah Shoja, his kingdom reached its zenith of power, stretching from Balochistan to Arran.

Early life 
Shah Shoja was born in 10 March 1333—he was the son of the Muzaffarid ruler Mubariz al-Din Muhammad and a woman named Khatun Qotlogh Beg, better known as Makhdum Shah, daughter of the Mongol ruler Qutb al-Din Shah Jahan. After Mubariz al-Din Muhammad's conquest of Kerman in 1341, he organized a marriage between Shah Shoja and a daughter of one of the tribal Mongol chieftains who roamed the region. Shah Shoja later prevented his father from having the tomb of the prominent Persian poet Saadi Shirazi demolished, whom Mubariz al-Din Muhammad had condemned for his poems on religious factors. In 1358, Shah Shoja blinded and imprisoned his cruel father, and thus succeeded him as the ruler of the Muzaffarid dynasty.

Reign 
Shah Shoja proved to be a less of a tyrannic figure than his father, but he was constantly fighting with his brothers, causing a long period of instability. In ca. 1362, he had his vizier Qavam al-Din Hasan executed, and replaced with Kamal al-Din Husayn Rashidi. In 1363 he marched against his first brother Shah Mahmud, who had been given control of Isfahan, although a peace was soon brokered. 

In the following year however, Shah Mahmud, with the support of his father-in-law Shaikh Awais Jalayir of the Jalayirids, invaded Fars and captured Shiraz. Shah Shoja would not be able to reconquer his capital until 1366. Shah Mahmud would continue to play and influential role in Iranian politics, using his marriage alliance to claim Tabriz from the Jalayirids after Shaikh Awais Jalayir died in 1374. He occupied the city but soon gave up after he was struck by illness. He died the next year, allowing Shah Shoja to occupy Isfahan. 

Shah Shoja then occupied Azerbaijan and Arran for four months, until he was forced to turn back when internal conditions in Fars deteriorated. His second brother Shah Muzaffar's son, Shah Yahya, rose in revolt in Isfahan. Having to make peace with the Jalayirids, Shah Shoja offered to marry his son Zain al-Abidin to a sister of the Jalayirid ruler Shaikh Hussain Jalayir. The Jalayirids refused the offer and invaded, although Shah Shoja managed to prevent them from getting any further than Sultaniyya. In 1383, Shah Shoja, whilst intoxicated by alcohol and full of skepticism, had his son Sultan Shebli blinded, which he regretted the following day. A series of other tragedies followed shortly after the blinding of his son—Shah Shoja's mother Makhdum Shah and his nephew Shah Hossein died, whilst he himself received a deadly illness as a result of excessive drinking.

Before dying in 1384, he named his son Zain al-Abidin his successor and his third brother Imad al-Din Ahmad as governor of Kerman. Not satisfied with the arrangement, Shah Yahya advanced against Shiraz, but was expelled from Isfahan by the city's populace and was forced to flee to Yazd. On his deathbed, Shah Shoja wrote a letter to the powerful Turco-Mongol warlord Timur, who was then campaigning in Azerbaijan, in which he gave his sons' loyalty to the conqueror.

Legacy 

The representation of Shah Shoja as portrayed by contemporary and subsequent historians is that of a sophisticated yet at times harsh renaissance prince, well-educated in scholarly and theological sciences, a poet and man of learning himself, and likewise a benevolent advocate of knowledge and literary work. He was known to be very involved in scholarly discussions, with his own views on technical and rhetorical cases. 

The famous Persian poet Hafez spent much of his career as a poet during the reign of Shah Shoja, and alluded to him 39 times. The 18th-century Zand ruler of Iran, Karim Khan Zand (r. 1751–1779) had the burial place of Shah Shoja renovated.

References

Sources 
Jackson, Peter. "Muzaffarids."  Encyclopaedia of Islam, Volume VII (Mif-Naz). New ed. 1993. 
M. Ismail Marcinkowski, Persian Historiography and Geography: Bertold Spuler on Major Works Produced in Iran, the Caucasus, Central Asia, India and Early Ottoman Turkey, with a foreword by Professor Clifford Edmund Bosworth, member of the British Academy, Singapore: Pustaka Nasional, 2003, .
Roemer, H. R. "The Jalayirids, Muzaffarids and Sarbadars." The Cambridge History of Iran Volume 6: The Timurid and Safavid Periods. Edited by Peter Jackson. New York: Cambridge University Press, 1986. 
 
 
 
 
 
 

1384 deaths
1333 births
14th-century monarchs in the Middle East
14th-century Iranian people
People from Shiraz
Muzaffarids (Iran)